General Frost is a nickname given to the Russian Winter. General Frost may also refer to:

Daniel M. Frost (1823–1900), Missouri Volunteer Militia brigadier general and Confederate States Army brigadier general
John Frost (British Army officer) (1912–1993), British Army major general
Kathryn Frost (1948–2006), U.S. Army major general
Malcolm B. Frost (born 1966), U.S. Army major general